Kelly Choi (born February 7, 1976) is a Korean-American, Emmy-nominated television personality on NYC Media, the official broadcast service of the City of New York. A former host of Bravo TV's Top Chef spin-off, Top Chef Masters, she has also been presenter of the documentary series Secrets of New York.

Early life and career 
Choi was born in 1976 in a poor South Korean village. She was the fifth of six siblings, who grew up in post-war Korea. She lost two of her siblings through hunger. At the age of 14, she moved to Seoul, where she started working in a factory by day. Choi was a preschooler when she immigrated to the U.S. with her family. Growing up in central Virginia, she Americanized her given name and, as Kelly Choi, received her bachelor's degree from the College of William & Mary and her master's in journalism from Columbia University in Manhattan. During and following her studies, Choi, who stands 5'10" (1.78 meters), was a model with Ford Models, won the Elite Models Look of the Year and worked as a VJ for MTV Korea.

Career 
Choi made the professional transition to the New York area by hosting Freckles, a lifestyle program on the cable channel Plum TV, which is seen primarily in affluent vacation communities, in this case, the Hamptons in Long Island's Suffolk County. She entered the highly competitive New York media market after joining nyctv (now NYC Media), in 2004. Executive producers Arick Wierson and Trevor Scotland initially brought her to host the pilot episode for Secrets of New York. She subsequently went on to host three seasons of the series, nationally distributed by PBS, and developed Eat Out NY, another nyctv program in which, as the host/guide to the city's restaurants, she gained high visibility and popularity.

For a few months in 2006, as part of a unique content-sharing arrangement between nyctv and NBC's flagship station WNBC, Eat Out NY and Choi became popular fixtures of the Tri-State Region's noontime viewing. In 2007, she was invited as a guest judge on the Food Network's Iron Chef and selected to host the James Beard Awards, which are considered the "Oscars" of the food and restaurant industry. In 2011, she was a host of Late Night Kung Fu, a weekly series that celebrates classic, English-dubbed kung fu films.

Choi has received three Emmy nominations from the New York chapter of the National Academy of Television Arts and Sciences.

When Choi moved to Paris, she started working on her company Sushi Daily with Yamamoto-San. She then founded Japanese snacks and food brand Kelly Loves. 

In 2010, Choi founded Asian-inspired food company KellyDeli. Currently, the company has six brands: Sushi Daily, Korma Kitchen, Bam’bu, Kelly Loves, BamTuk and TukTuk.

Due to Choi's child experience losing two siblings through hunger, KellyDeli started raising funds in 2020 to support Action Against Hunger, an international organization that fights child hunger and malnutrition. KellyDeli helped to save the lives of more than 10,000 children in India.

See also
 Koreans in New York City
 New Yorkers in journalism

References

External links
 
      

1976 births
Living people
People from Seoul
People from Virginia
People from New York City
American female models
College of William & Mary alumni
South Korean emigrants to the United States
South Korean female models
South Korean women journalists
American women journalists
South Korean television personalities
VJs (media personalities)
American television journalists
Participants in American reality television series
Columbia University Graduate School of Journalism alumni